Leela Samson (born 6 May 1951) is a Bharatanatyam dancer, choreographer, instructor, writer and actress from India. As a soloist, she is known for her technical virtuosity and has taught Bharatanatyam at Shriram Bhartiya Kala Kendra in Delhi for many years.

She was appointed as the director of Kalakshetra by the Congress-led United Progressive Alliance in April 2005. She was subsequently also appointed as the chairperson of the Sangeet Natak Akademi in August 2010 and as the chairperson of the Central Board of Film Certification (CBFC) in April 2011.

She resigned from her position as director of Kalakshetra in 2012. She resigned from her position as chairperson of the CBFC after the Film Certification Appellate Tribunal overturned her attempt to ban the film MSG: The Messenger of God featuring Dera Sacha Sauda founder Gurmeet Ram Rahim Singh in a lead role and gave it clearance.

She made her film acting debut in 2015 through the Tamil film, OK Kanmani directed by Mani Ratnam. She reprised her role in the film's Hindi remake,  OK Jaanu (2017). She also appeared in Adithya Varma (2019) and Putham Pudhu Kaalai (2020).

Early life and training
Samson was born on 6 May 1951 in Coonoor, Tamil Nadu, daughter of Vice Admiral Benjamin Abraham Samson and Laila Samson. Her father belonged to the Jewish Bene-Israelite community from Pune, and her mother belonged to the Gujarati Roman Catholic community from Ahmedabad.  Her father joined the Royal Indian Navy in 1939 and rose to command in the Indian Fleet in 1964. He also served as Commandant of the National Defence Academy in Khadakvasla between 1959 and 1962. Leela's paternal aunt Annie was the Principal of Anjum-e-Islam Muslim school for girls in Mumbai for 31 years.

When Samson was nine years of age, her father sent her to Kalakshetra to learn Indian classical dance and music under the founder, Rukmini Devi Arundale and she studied in the Besant Theosophical High School at the same time. She completed her B.A. from Sophia College for Women and this is where she was inspired to make her career in Bharatnatyam. After completing her B.A., Samson continued to learn Bharatanatyam at Kalakshetra.

Career
Starting her career as a Bharatanatyam soloist, Samson taught at Shriram Bharatiya Kala Kendra, Delhi, and Gandharva Mahavidyalaya, Delhi. Over the years, she started performing across India and abroad including Europe, Africa and the Americas.

In 1995, Samson formed Spanda, a dance group to review the traditional vocabulary of Bharatanatyam. Two documentary films – Sanchari and The Flowering Tree – have been made on her works. Her notable disciples included Joyce Paul Poursabahian and Justin McCarthy, who now teaches at Sri Ram Bhartiya Kala Kendra. She has taught and mentored performers including the late Kamaljit Bhasin Maalik (Meeto), Jin Shan Shan (Eesha), Navtej Singh Johar and Anusha Subramanyam.

She authored a biography of Rukmini Devi Arundale. She has taught Bharatanatyam across the world, including at the Royal Opera House, Covent Garden, London, and the annual Milapfest in Manchester.

Awards
Samson has received the Padma Shri (1990), the Sanskriti, Nritya Choodamani, Kalaimamani (2005) given by Government of Tamil Nadu, and the Sangeet Natak Akademi Award (1999–2000) for contributions to Bharatanatyam.

She was also nominated for the Filmfare Award for Best Supporting Actress-Tamil at the 63rd Filmfare Awards South.

Controversy
Samson is known for her proximity to the Nehru-Gandhi of the Indian National Congress, as she was the dance tutor of Priyanka Vadra.  Samson held six key positions in the 10 years of Congress-led United Progressive Alliance regime. Many papers including the Indian Express alleged favouritism regarding her appointment as the chairperson of the censor board by UPA govt in 2011:

Samson's tenures at Kalakshetra, Sangeet Natak Akademi and the censor board were mired with many controversies amid allegations of corruption, illegal appointments and arbitrary awarding of contracts, as well as financial irregularities.

Samson was criticised by the Vishwa Hindu Parishad when she passed the 2014 Aamir Khan-starrer movie PK without any cuts, even after two board members resigned after it was granted certification, due to content allegedly designed to ridicule Hindu religious philosophy and hurt Hindu sentiments. Veteran Bollywood actor and a former chairperson of the censor board Anupam Kher criticised Samson for playing politics by making partisan allegations while tendering her resignation. This criticism was made highlighting the history of CBFC under her leadership which agreed to make cuts in Entertainment after protests by Muslim groups and also agreed to make cuts in Kamaal Dhamaal Malamaal after protests by Christian groups, personally assuring them that "necessary action had been taken".

In December 2019, Central Bureau of Investigation filed a case of corruption and criminal breach of trust against Samson and three other Kalakshetra colleagues for financial irregularities.

Works
 Samson, Leela (1987). Rhythm in Joy: Classical Indian Dance Traditions. New Delhi: Lustre Press.
 Samson, Leela (2010). Rukmini Devi: A Life, Delhi: Penguin Books, India, .

Filmography

Awards and nominations

References

External links
 Leela Samson Official Website
 Her Majesty, Richard Turner interviewed Leela Samson (August 2003)

Bene Israel
Performers of Indian classical dance
Indian classical choreographers
Indian dance teachers
Bharatanatyam exponents
Dance writers
1951 births
Living people
Indian Jews
Women writers from Tamil Nadu
Recipients of the Padma Shri in arts
Recipients of the Sangeet Natak Akademi Award
Indian arts administrators
Kalakshetra Foundation alumni
Recipients of the Kalaimamani Award
People from Nilgiris district
Indian women choreographers
Indian choreographers
Dancers from Tamil Nadu
20th-century Indian dancers
Women educators from Tamil Nadu
Teachers of Indian classical dance
20th-century Indian women artists
20th-century Indian educators
20th-century Indian women writers
20th-century Indian non-fiction writers
Educators from Tamil Nadu
Women artists from Tamil Nadu
20th-century women educators
Actresses in Malayalam cinema
Actresses in Tamil cinema
Actresses in Hindi cinema